"Moses" is a song by American rapper French Montana. It was released on August 21, 2015, as the second single from his mixtape, Casino Life 2 (2015). The hip hop song, which was produced by Southside, TM88, DJ Spinz and K-Major, features vocals from Chris Brown and Migos.

Track listing 
Download digital
Moses (featuring Chris Brown and Migos) — 5:00

Music video
On November 12, 2015, Montana uploaded the music video for "Moses" on his YouTube and Vevo account.

Critical reception
Colin Joyce from Spin called it "a lovely, druggy futurist and (Future-ish) single". Calling it a "high powered" song, C. Vernon Coleman II of XXL wrote that Brown "comes up with the catchy chorus".

Charts

Weekly charts

References

2015 singles
2015 songs
French Montana songs
Chris Brown songs
Bad Boy Records singles
Songs written by Chris Brown
Songs written by DJ Spinz
Songs written by French Montana
Songs written by Southside (record producer)
Songs written by Quavo
Songs written by Offset (rapper)
Songs written by Takeoff (rapper)
Songs written by TM88